Raphitoma striolaris is an extinct species of sea snail, a marine gastropod mollusc in the family Raphitomidae.

Description
The length of the shell attains 11 mm. 

Spire scalariform; whorls separated by a deep, undulating suture; subsutural ramp adorned with whitish commas (« albo-virgulatae » in Monterosato); sculpture made of few, sharp, raised spiral ridges running upon even fewer radial costae, giving the shell a clathrate appearance. Shallow water, north of the harbor, east of the bridge, along the Avenue des Étangs, Frontignan-plage, Occitania. Original picture provided by J. Renoult for iNaturalist (CC BY-NC).

Distribution
Fossils of this extinct marine species were found in Eocene strata in France.

References

 Cossmann (M.) & Pissarro (G.), 1913 Iconographie complète des coquilles fossiles de l'Éocène des environs de Paris, t. 2, p. pl. 46-65
 Le Renard (J.) & Pacaud (J.-M.), 1995 Révision des Mollusques paléogènes du Bassin de Paris. 2 - Liste des références primaires des espèces. Cossmanniana, t. 3, vol. 3, p. 65-132

External links
 Natural History Museum, Rotterdam: Raphitoma striolaris

striolaris
Gastropods described in 1837